"The Centre of the Heart" is a song by Swedish pop music duo Roxette, released on 19 March 2001 as the lead single from their seventh studio album, Room Service. An uptempo pop song, it was written by Per Gessle and originally demoed in January 1998 during sessions for their previous album Have a Nice Day (1999). The single was backed by an exclusive B-side, "Entering Your Heart", along with several remixes by StoneBridge.

The track became one of the duo's biggest hits in their home country, spending four weeks on top of the Swedish Singles Chart. It also entered the top 10 in Romania and Spain and charted moderately in several other European territories. Longtime collaborator Jonas Åkerlund directed the song's music video, which was Roxette's most expensive and was criticised for negatively portraying women.

Background and recording
The song was written by Per Gessle early in the development stages of Roxette's preceding studio album, Have a Nice Day (1999). It was first demoed in El Cortijo Studios in Marbella, Spain, in January 1998, and is the only track on Room Service to feature a co-production credit for Michael Ilbert.

Release and promotion
The song is officially titled "The Centre of the Heart", although multiple promotional singles were issued which titled the track "The Centre of the Heart (Is a Suburb to the Brain)". Non-album track "Entering Your Heart" appears as a b-side on most editions of the single. An extended version of the b-side, containing an extra verse, also appeared on Japanese editions of Room Service. A maxi single was also issued, containing four remixes of the song by Swedish DJ StoneBridge, as well as an additional remix created by Jens Bjurman and Per Kalenius, titled the 'Yoga Remix'.

Roxette debuted "The Centre of the Heart" live on 23 February during an interval at the Swedish Melodifestivalen 2001. The song's music video was directed by longtime collaborator Jonas Åkerlund and was filmed over three days at The Madonna Inn in California. It remains Roxette's most expensive music video to date, surpassing the budget of "Spending My Time" from their 1991 album, Joyride.

Commercial performance
The song became one of the duo's biggest hits in their home country Sweden, topping the Sverigetopplistan chart for four consecutive weeks and being certified platinum by the Swedish Recording Industry Association for sales in excess of 30,000 copies. It ended 2001 as the 14th-best-selling single in the country. It was also a hit in Spain, topping the Spanish Airplay Chart and peaking at number seven on the national sales chart. The single became a top-twenty hit in Finland, where it charted at number 13, and peaked within the top thirty in Austria, Belgium, and Switzerland. The track peaked at number 31 and spent nine weeks on the German Singles Chart. It was not released as a single in Ireland or the United Kingdom.

Track listings
All songs were written by Per Gessle.

 CD single (Australia 8790312 · Europe 8791712)
 "The Centre of the Heart" – 3:22
 "Entering Your Heart" – 3:59

 CD maxi – remixes (8792302)
 "The Centre of the Heart" – 3:22
 "The Centre of the Heart"  – 3:37
 "The Centre of the Heart"  – 7:49
 "The Centre of the Heart"  – 3:29
 "The Centre of the Heart"  – 6:36
 "The Centre of the Heart"  – 6:36

Credits and personnel
Credits are adapted from the liner notes of The Pop Hits.

Studios
 Recorded at El Cortijo Studios (Marbella, Spain) in January 1998 and Atlantis and Polar Studios (Stockholm, Sweden) in November 2000
 Mixed at Polar Studios (Stockholm, Sweden)

Musicians
 Marie Fredriksson – lead and background vocals, production
 Per Gessle – background vocals, electric guitar, production, mixing
 Michael Ilbert – synthesizer, programming, engineering, co-production
 Christoffer Lundquist – background vocals, percussion
 Clarence Öfwerman – keyboards, programming, production, mixing
 Shooting Star – programming
 Strings by Stockholm Session Strings; conducted by Mats Holmquist
 Ronny Lahti – mixing

Charts

Weekly charts

Year-end charts

Certifications

Release history

References

External links
 

1998 songs
2001 singles
EMI Records singles
Music video controversies
Music videos directed by Jonas Åkerlund
Number-one singles in Sweden
Roxette songs
Songs written by Per Gessle